Artimes Farshad Yeganeh (born 27 May 1981 in Tehran, Iran) is an Iranian rock climber who has been climbing for 30 years of experiences as a professional climber, members of Iran sport climbing National Team for many years, as route setter in many national, continental and world cups and championships, and head coach of Iran Sport Climbing National Team for 6 years. He also participates in sport climbing and bouldering competitions and is one of the most famous Iranian climbers.

Biography

Artimes was elected as one of the five members among sport climbing experts over Tehran province to make Tehran climbing league's statute.  Then, he participated as a first Iranian Alpine Club's representative in bouldering world cup of 2009 in France. As he truly is well known for lead climbing, he also solo climbed two routes. Currently, Artimes and Amin Abbasi are the only Iranian Continental route setters. He became IFSC JUNIOR Route setter in 2019 and Asian Chief Route Setter. He also became International Route Setter in 2020.He is only Iranian International Route Setter.

Positions
Here are some positions he has held:

 2007Tehran Mountaineering and Sport climbingEducational Consultant
 2008Tehran Mountaineering and Sport climbingEducational Consultant
 2009Tehran League founding member
 2009Tehran Mountaineering and Sport climbingEducational Consultant
 2010Tehran Mountaineering and Sport climbingEducational Consultant
 2011Tehran Mountaineering and Sport climbingEducational Consultant
 2013Tehran Rebolting Committee
 2014Iran Mountaineering and Sport Climbing FederationSport Climbing CommitteeRoute Setting Director 
 2014Iran Mountaineering and Sport Climbing FederationSport Climbing CommitteeRoute Setting Director 
 2015Iran Mountaineering and Sport Climbing FederationSport Climbing CommitteeRoute Setting Director 
 2015Iran Mountaineering and Sport Climbing FederationNational Team CommitteeHead Coach of Youth Team
 2016Iran Mountaineering and Sport Climbing FederationNational Team CommitteeHead Coach of Youth Team
 2016Iran Mountaineering and Sport Climbing FederationSport Climbing CommitteeRoute Setting Director 
 2017 — Member of Sport Department ACC of IFSC  – Asian Continental Council 
 2017Iran Mountaineering and Sport Climbing FederationSport Climbing CommitteeRoute Setting Director
 2017Iran Mountaineering and Sport Climbing FederationNational Team CommitteeHead Coach of Youth Team
 2018 – Iran Mountaineering and Sport Climbing Federation–Sport Climbing Committee–Route Setting Director
 2018Iran Mountaineering and Sport Climbing FederationHead Coach of Combined Team
 2019 – Iran Mountaineering and Sport Climbing Federation–Sport Climbing Committee–Route Setting Director
 2019Iran Mountaineering and Sport Climbing FederationHead Coach of Combined Team
 2020 – Iran Mountaineering and Sport Climbing Federation–Sport Climbing Committee–Route Setting Director
 2020 — IFSC International Route Setter  – International Sport Climbing Route Setter
 2021 — Member of Route Setting Commission of IFSC  – International Sport Climbing Federation 2021
 2021 — Member of Route Setting Commission of ACC of IFSC  – Asian Continental Council.
 2021 — Chair of Coaching Commission  Iran Mountaineering and Sport Climbing Federation

Coaching

Coaching certificates
 IRI Sport Climbing and Mountaineering FederationSport Climbing Coach Grade 1
 IRI Sport Climbing and Mountaineering FederationSport Climbing Coach Grade 2
 IRI Sport Climbing and Mountaineering FederationSport Climbing Coach Grade 3
 Rock Climbing Federation of GermanySport Climbing Coach Level 1, Level 2 and Level C1

Coaching experience

Route setting

Route Setting certificates
 IRI Sport Climbing and Mountaineering FederationSport Climbing Route Setter Level 1
 IRI Sport Climbing and Mountaineering FederationSport Climbing Route Setter Level 2
 IRI Sport Climbing and Mountaineering FederationNational Sport Climbing Route Setter
 ACC of IFSCContinental Sport Climbing Route Setter
 IFSC Junior International Sport Climbing Route Setter
 IFSC International Route Setter International Sport Climbing Route Setter
 Member of Route Setting Commission of IFSC International Sport Climbing Federation 2021
 Member of Route Setting Commission of ACC of IFSC  Asian Continental Council 2021
 Member of Sport Department ACC of IFSC  Asian Continental Council 2017

Route setting experiences
 Chief Route Setter
2006Chief Route SetterUniversity Student National Championship
2007Chief Route SetterJunior and Youth National Championship
 2007Chief Route SetterUniversity Student National Championship
2009Chief Route SetterNational Championship
 2011Route SetterIFSC Master Cup international Competition 
 2013Route Setter IFSC Asian Championships Tehran, Iran
 2015Route Setter IFSC Asian Youth Championship Malaysia
 2016Route Setter IFSC Asian Youth Championship Iran
 2016Route SetterIFSC World Cup Munich, Germany
 2017Route Setter IFSC Asian Championship Tehran, Iran
 2017Route SetterIFSC Youth World Championship Innsbruck, Austria
 2017Route Setter IFSC Asian Cup Wanxianchan, China
 2018Route SetterIFSC World university Championships Slovakia
 2018Route Setter IFSC Asian Games Palembang, Indonesia
 2018Chief Route Setter IFSC Asian Championship Totori, Japan
 2019Route SetterIFSC World Cup bouldering Munich, Germany
 2019Route SetterIFSC China open Guanzhuo, China
 2019Route Setter IFSC Asian Youth Championship Combined Chongqing, China
 2019Chief Route Setter IFSC Asian Youth Championship Bengaloru, India
 2020 Route Setter IFSC European Championships Moscow, Russia
 2021 Route Setter IFSC Youth World Championships Voronezh, Russia

Judging

Judging certificates
 IRI Sport Climbing and Mountaineering FederationSport Climbing National Judge

Iran National Team memberships 

 Junior National Team
 1999
  National Team
 2003 
 2004China, Asian Championship
 2005Kerman (IRI), UIAA Asian Championship
 2006Kaoshiung (TPE), UIAA Asian Championships
 2007Qinghai (CHN), IFSC Climbing Worldcup (L+S)
 2009France, Bouldering Worldcup

Ranks and medals

IFSC Climbing Worldcup

UIAA Asian Championships

Fajr championships

National championships

Tehran Province championships

Tehran Province League

Groups Cup

Solo

 Mashalah, 7c, 20 meters, Overhanging & Roof, Kermanshah, Iran, 2006, first ascent
 Gordefa, 7a+, 25 meters, Polokhab, Iran, 2006, first ascent

Climbing
Here are some of his Tops & First Ascent climbs:

Roc Trips

 Petzl 2008 
 Petzl 2009 
 Petzl 2014

Filmography

 Mashalla

Route
Here are some of the routes he bolted:

References

1981 births
Living people
Iranian rock climbers
Sportspeople from Tehran